Javier Gutiérrez Álvarez (born 17 January 1971) is a Spanish actor. After his 2002 acting debut in cinema, he developed an early career primarily in comedy films, likewise earning much popularity for his sidekick role as Satur in adventure television series Águila Roja. His performance in 2014 crime thriller Marshland earned him wide acclaim and recognition. He has since starred in films such as The Motive, Champions and The Daughter and television series such as Estoy vivo and Vergüenza.

Biography 
Javier Gutiérrez Álvarez was born in the Asturian parish of Luanco on 17 January 1971. His mother was from the likewise Asturian municipality of Belmonte de Miranda. When he was barely one year old, he moved with his parents to Ferrol, Galicia, where he was raised.

Seeking to develop a career as a stage actor, Gutiérrez moved from Galicia to Madrid at age 19. He appeared in stage plays such as La tinaja (1993) and La cabeza del dragón (1994), with Jesús Salgado as theatre director. He joined the  theatre group. He had his debut in television in 2000, whereas his debut in a feature film came with his performance in the 2002 musical comedy The Other Side of the Bed, directed by Emilio Martínez Lázaro.

Gutiérrez became very popular to a television audience in Spain for his work in adventure series Águila Roja (2009–2016), portraying Satur (the squire of the protagonist). The role has been highlighted as the most charismatic character of his career.

He portrayed Falconetti in Zip & Zap and the Marble Gang (2013). He portrayed Tomás de Torquemada in Assassin's Creed (2016). He first declined it because he was filming The Olive Tree, by Icíar Bollaín, but then he was convinced by the director Justin Kurzel in a Skype call. He portrayed the fictional character Sergeant Jimeno Costa in 1898: Los últimos de Filipinas (2016). He portrayed Álvaro in The Motive (2017), for which he received the Goya Award for Best Actor.

Filmography

Accolades

References

External links 

1971 births
Living people
Spanish male film actors
Spanish male stage actors
Spanish male television actors
21st-century Spanish male actors